Steven Michael Shepro is a former lieutenant general in the United States Air Force who served as the 21st deputy chairman of the North Atlantic Treaty Organization Military Committee. He assisted the chairman's role as principal adviser to the NATO secretary general and senior military spokesman of the 29-nation alliance. He also advised the deputy secretary general, led coordination of nuclear, biological and chemical matters,  and, in the chairman's absence, directed daily operations and the business of the Military Committee, NATO's highest military authority.

Raised in Hollywood, California, General Shepro was commissioned in 1984 as a distinguished graduate (magna cum laude) of the U.S. Air Force Academy and is an Olmsted Scholar fluent in multiple languages. He is a command pilot with more than 3,000 flying hours in fighters, helicopters, and tactical airlift with over 600 combat hours in numerous operations. He has commanded at operational squadron, group and wing levels, and led frontline Battlefield Airmen in Operation Iraqi Freedom. He has served on the U.S. Joint Staff, Air Staff, and in Coalition Command and Combatant Command positions. General Shepro retired out of the Air Force in 2019. 

In 2020, he joined Boeing and held several executive positions as Vice President of Fixed-Wing Aircraft, Global Sales & Marketing and Vice President Bombers & Fighters, Business Development for  Boeing Defense, Space & Security, and was a member of Boeing's corporate Sustainability Council.

In 2023, Shepro joined Pratt & Whitney, and is currently Vice President of Integrated Customer Solutions, overseeing global business development of the corporation's defense sector, Military Engines.  He is also a teaching fellow at SMU's Tower Center for Public Policy and International Affairs, a senior mentor for the NATO Defense College, a member of the Council on Foreign Relations, and a board member of the Olmsted Foundation.

Education
 1984 Distinguished graduate, Bachelor of Science, U.S. Air Force Academy, Colorado
 1990 Distinguished graduate, Squadron Officer School, Maxwell Air Force Base, Alabama 
 1995 Master's degree in International Affairs, Institut d'Etudes Politiques, Université de Strasbourg, France
 1996 Air Command and Staff College, by correspondence
 1999 Escuela Superior de Guerra Aérea, Buenos Aires, Argentina
 2001 Air War College, by correspondence
 2005 Master's degree in National Security, National War College, Washington, D.C.
 2011 Senior Executive National and International Security Program, Harvard University, Massachusetts

Assignments
 August 1984 - June 1985, student, undergraduate pilot training (helicopter), Fort Rucker, Alabama 
 June 1985 - March 1987, H-1 pilot, 37th Air Rescue and Recovery Squadron, Warren AFB, Wyoming
 March 1987 - June 1988, H-1N weapons officer and instructor pilot, 67th Special Operations Squadron, Zaragoza Air Base, Spain
 June 1988 - December 1988, student, UPT (fixed wing conversion), Vance AFB, Oklahoma 
 December 1988 - July 1991, A-10 flight commander, 509th Tactical Fighter Squadron, Royal Air Force Alconbury, England
 August 1991 - October 1992, A-10 flight commander and instructor pilot, 78th and 510th Tactical Fighter Squadrons, RAF Bentwaters, England 
 October 1992 - September 1995, Olmsted Scholar, European Parliament and Council of Europe Intern, Strasbourg, France
 October 1995 - September 1997, F-16, weapons and tactics chief, 388th Fighter Wing, Hill AFB, Utah 
 December 1997 - December 1998, student, Escuela Superior de Guerra Aérea, Argentina
 December 1998 - December 2001, chief of international fighter programs, Office of the Deputy Under Secretary of the Air Force (International Affairs), Washington, D.C.
 January 2002 - November 2002, director of operations, 52nd Operational Support Squadron, Spangdahlem Air Base, Germany
 November 2002 - June 2004, commander of 2nd Air Support Operations Squadron, Wurzburg, Germany
 July 2004 - June 2005, student, National War College, Fort Lesley J. McNair, Washington, D.C. 
 July 2005 - May 2007, commander of 18th Air Support Operations Group, Pope AFB, North Carolina
 July 2007 - July 2008, vice commander of 332nd Air Expeditionary Wing, Balad Air Base, Iraq
 August 2008 - June 2010, commander of 316th Wing, and commander of Joint Base Andrews, Maryland
 July 2010  - July 2012, director for strategy, policy and plans (J5), Headquarters U.S. Southern Command, Miami, Florida 
 August 2012 - August 2013, commanding general of NATO Air Training Command Afghanistan; and commander of 438th Air Expeditionary Wing, Kabul, Afghanistan
 September 2013 - June 2014, director of operations, deputy chief of staff for operations, plans and requirements (A3O), Headquarters U.S. Air Force, Washington, D.C. 
 June 2014 - October 2016, vice director for strategic plans and policy (J5), Joint Staff, the Pentagon, Washington, D.C. 
 November 2016 - present:  deputy chairman of North Atlantic Treaty Organization Military Committee, Brussels, Belgium

Summary of joint assignments
 November 2002 – June 2004, senior air liaison officer to 1st Infantry Division, Wurzburg, Germany (February 2003 – April 2003, senior air liaison officer to V Corps Assault Command, Iraq; February 2004 – April 2004, senior air liaison officer to Multi-National Division-North, Iraq), as a lieutenant colonel 
 July 2005 – May 2007, senior jump air liaison officer to 18th Airborne Corps, Fort Bragg, N.C. (August 2005 – February 2006, senior air liaison officer to Multi-National Corps-Iraq), as a colonel 
 July 2010 – July 2012, director for strategy, policy and plans (J5), Headquarters U.S. Southern Command, Miami, Fla., as a brigadier general
 July 2012 – August 2013, commanding general, NATO Air Training Command Afghanistan; and commander of 438th Air Expeditionary Wing, Kabul, Afghanistan, as a brigadier general 
 June 2014 – October 2016, vice director for strategic plans and policy (J5), Joint Staff, the Pentagon, Washington, D.C., as a major general
 November 2016 – present:  deputy chairman of North Atlantic Treaty Organization Military Committee, Brussels, Belgium, as a lieutenant general

Flight Information
Rating: command pilot

Flight hours: more than 3,000, including 600 combat hours

Aircraft flown: F-16, A-10, H-1, C-27

Awards and decorations

Effective dates of promotion

References 

1962 births
Living people
People from Hollywood, Los Angeles
People from Sherman Oaks, Los Angeles
United States Air Force Academy alumni
University of Strasbourg alumni
National War College alumni
United States Air Force generals
Recipients of the Defense Distinguished Service Medal
Recipients of the Legion of Merit
Recipients of the Air Medal